Mahadevsthan Mandan is a village development committee in Kavrepalanchok District in the Bagmati Zone of central Nepal.

Demographics 
At the time of the 1991 Nepal census it had a population of 6,892 in 1,216 individual households.

Geography 
Mahadevsthan Ward No. 4 is the passway for Helambu and supports trekking. Melamchi and Gosaikund are places of religious importance.

It is part of Mandandeupur municipality and number 3 out of 7 provinces in Nepal. It includes wards 7, 8 and 9.

Governance 
In 2017, Mahadevsthan Mandan was merged into Mandandeupur Municipality.

References

External links
UN map of the municipalities of Kavrepalanchowk District

Populated places in Kavrepalanchok District